Igor Gorbokon (born 13 October 1973) is a Ukrainian judoka.

Achievements

References

1973 births
Living people
Ukrainian male judoka
Universiade medalists in judo
Universiade silver medalists for Ukraine
Medalists at the 1999 Summer Universiade
20th-century Ukrainian people
21st-century Ukrainian people